The Saltmen of Tibet is a 1997 film that chronicles the trek undertaken by a clan of Tibetan salt harvesters across scenic but dangerous territory from their settlement to the sacred lakes where salt is harvested. The salt is then traded for foodstuffs to maintain the clan for the following year. Woven into the movie are excerpts of a Tibetan singer from the tribe telling the tale of King Gesar of Ling, a traditional Tibetan epic.

The dialogue in the film is in Tibetan with English subtitles.

Awards
Cineprix Swisscom Swiss audiences' choice as best documentary of 1997
Cariddi d'Oro (Best Film) 1997 Taormina Film Fest
Sonje Award for Best Foreign Independent Film 1997 Pusan International Film Festival
Golden Spire Award 1998 San Francisco International Film Festival
Prix Nanook (Grand Prix) 1998 Dix-septième Bilan du Film Ethnographique, Paris

See also
 Tibet-Nepal salt trade route
 Himalaya (film)

References

External links

Objective Cinema

1997 films
German documentary films
Swiss documentary films
Tibetan-language films
Anthropology documentary films
Documentary films about Tibet
Salt production
1990s German films